Elene Arandia Arnal (born October 27, 1989) is a Spanish singer and musician.

She made her debut at the age of twelve in Betizu on the ETB 1 channel, being one of several Betizu artists (a former Betizu Star).

Early life 
Elene Arandia was born in 1989 in Tolosa, Gipuzkoa, Basque Country (Spain).

Career 

She began his television career in 2004 on the Betizu program on the ETB 1 channel where he debuted at just 12 years of age. She was part of the Betizu Taldea music group, along with Zuriñe Hidalgo and Telmo Idígoras.

In 2006 she participated in the hit TV talent show Egin kantu! of ETB 1 as a contestant and singer. Her participation and roles in the hit TV shows Betizu and Egin kantu! brought her acclaimed success and made her a child star in the Basque Country, becaming well known among the children and the audience.

She also participated in programs like Ordu Txikitan and Hator Hator. In 2009 she participated in the ETB 1 Bi Gira contest, along with her cousin, Izaro Saizar, where they managed to reach the final and win the contest.

She studied the Bachelor's Degree in Communication Humanities at the University of Deusto and has subsequently worked as a communicator and journalist, especially with links to music.

She is currently a singer and session musician. She is the vocalist of the Basque music group Tenpora.

Discography 

 2018, Itzulika

Filmography

Television 

 2001–2004, Betizu, ETB 1 (actress, singer)
 2006–2007, Egin kantu!, ETB 1 (contestant, singer)
 2007–2008, Ordu Txikitan, ETB 1
 2008–2009, Bi Gira, ETB 1

Film 

 2015, Nahia

See also 

 Betizu
 Betizu Taldea
 Egin kantu!
 Nerea Alias
 Zuriñe Hidalgo

References

External links 

 

1989 births
Living people
People from Tolosa, Spain
Spanish women singers
Basque singers
Spanish child singers
Spanish child actresses